Hala Ahmed Fouad (26 March 1958 – 10 May 1993) was an Egyptian film and television actress who predominantly worked in Egyptian cinema. She appeared in more than fifteen feature films notably opposite film star Salah Zulfikar in The Barefoot Millionaire (1987).

Biography 
She graduated from the faculty of Commerce in 1979. She worked in films in the 1980s having the chance to act alongside movie star Salah Zulfikar. Her father Ahmed Fouad was a filmmaker. She married veteran actor Ahmed Zaki in 1980. Her first son Haitham Ahmed Zaki was also a film actor who died on 7 November 2019. Later on, she married Ezzeddine Barakat and had another son, Rami.

Hala died on 10 May 1993, also at the age of 35 after battling with breast cancer.

Filmography 

 Regal fi el Masyada (1971)
 Al Hedek Yefham (1985)
 Al Awbash (1985)
 El Millionaira El Hafya (1987)
 Al Sadah Al Rejal (1987)
 Ashwami (1987)
 Haret El Gohary (1987)

See also  
 List of Egyptian films of the 1980s

References

External links 
 

1958 births
1993 deaths
Egyptian film actresses
20th-century Egyptian actresses
Egyptian television actresses
Actresses from Cairo
Egyptian child actresses
Deaths from cancer in Egypt
Deaths from breast cancer